John Cyril Collins was a Fijian cricketer. He played six first-class matches for the Fiji national cricket team on a tour of New Zealand in 1895. He scored Fiji's only century of the tour, an innings of  128 not out against Hawke's Bay.

References

Fijian cricketers
Year of death missing
Year of birth missing
Fijian people of British descent